Bishop Manogue Catholic High School is a Catholic high school in Reno, Nevada. It is the only Catholic high school in the Roman Catholic Diocese of Reno and one of only two Catholic high schools in the state of Nevada.

History
The Catholic high school was established in Reno, Nevada in 1948 and named for the first Bishop of Sacramento, Patrick Manogue. In 1957 the school moved from its location off of Mill Street to 400  Bartlett Street, off of Valley Road, adjacent to the University of Nevada, and was known as "The School on the Hill." Bishop Manogue Catholic High School remained at this location for nearly fifty years before being relocated in 2004 to a site in southwest Reno and the graduating class of 2004 was called "the Last Class on the Hill" to conclude 46 years at 400 Bartlett Street. The 1957 Bishop Manogue was torn down after it was purchased by the University of Nevada and the site is now home to an athletic center.

Presidents and Principals

Athletics
Manogue's school colors are green and gold, and its mascot is the Miner, in tribute to the school's namesake, Bishop Patrick Manogue, who was also a miner.

Nevada Interscholastic Activities Association State Championships
 Baseball - 1984, 1985, 1986, 1999, 2000, 2002, 2003, 2004
 Basketball (Girls) - 2001, 2003
 Basketball (Boys) - 2000, 2001
 Cross Country (Boys) - 1980, 1983
 Cross Country (Girls) - 1979, 1980, 1983, 1993
 Golf (Girls) - 2008
 Swimming (Boys) - 1990
 Volleyball (Girls) - 2008
 Football - 1957, 1958, 1970, 1971, 1972, 1975, 1979, 1982, 1987, 1988, 1999, 2002, 2003
 Golf (Boys) 2000, 2001, 2013
 Skiing (Boys) 2013, 2014

Notable alumni
 Don J. Briel - Founder of the Catholic Studies project
 Matt Gallagher - author and Iraq war veteran
 Kevin Jepsen - Pitcher for the Tampa Bay Rays, Member of bronze medal winning 2008 US Olympic Baseball Team
 Brian Sandoval - Governor of Nevada
 James David Santini - former U.S. Representative from Nevada
 Joe Wieland - Pitcher for the San Diego Padres
 Carter Wilkerson - Record holder. He holds the record for retweets on Twitter at 3.6 million retweets, beating previous record holder Ellen DeGeneres.
 Susan Desmond-Hellmann - Oncologist, UCSF chancellor from 2009-2013, and CEO of the Bill & Melinda Gates Foundation from 2013-2020. Appointed to President's Council of Advisors on Science and Technology in 2021.

Footnotes

High schools in Reno, Nevada
Catholic secondary schools in Nevada
Roman Catholic Diocese of Reno
Educational institutions established in 1948
Schools accredited by the Northwest Accreditation Commission
1948 establishments in Nevada